Three-time defending champion Roger Federer defeated Novak Djokovic in the final, 7–6(7–4), 7–6(7–2), 6–4 to win the men's singles tennis title at the 2007 US Open. It was his fourth consecutive US Open title and 12th major title overall. With the win, Federer marked his third year in which he won three of the four majors. Also, he reached a record-equaling 14th consecutive major quarterfinal (streak starting at the 2004 Wimbledon Championships), after Roy Emerson and Ivan Lendl. It was Djokovic's maiden major final, and the first of an eventual record 33 major final appearances.

This was the last major appearance for former world No. 4 Tim Henman.

Seeds

Qualifying draw

Draw

Finals

Top half

Section 1

Section 2

Section 3

Section 4

Bottom half

Section 5

Section 6

Section 7

Section 8

References

External links
 Association of Tennis Professionals (ATP) – 2007 US Open Men's Singles draw
2007 US Open – Men's draws and results at the International Tennis Federation

Men's Singles
US Open (tennis) by year – Men's singles